Khaneh Reghan (also Romanized as Khāneh Reghān; also known as Khāneh Rūghān) is a village in Hanza Rural District, Hanza District, Rabor County, Kerman Province, Iran. At the 2006 census, its population was 252, in 57 families.

References 

Populated places in Rabor County